The Ikarus Imagine is a German high-wing, single-place, hang glider, designed by Thomas Pellicci and produced by his company Ikarus Drachen Thomas Pellicci.

Production has been completed and the glider is no longer available.

Design and development
The Imagine was designed to be an intermediate glider with good performance.

The aircraft is made from aluminum tubing, with the wing covered in Dacron sailcloth. Its  span wing is cable braced from a single kingpost. The nose angle is 134° and the aspect ratio is 7.73:1. It is certified as DHV Class 2.

Specifications (Imagine)

References

Hang gliders